Caroline Abras (born August 11, 1987 in São Paulo) is a Brazilian actress.

Awards 

Won the best actress of the 2008 edition of the Festival do Rio for her role in Se Nada Mais Der Certo.

The actress had twice won the best actress award for short film at the Festival de Gramado.

Filmography

Television

Films

References

External links 

1987 births
Living people
Actresses from São Paulo
Brazilian telenovela actresses
Brazilian film actresses
Brazilian stage actresses